The Mo, also known simply as Mo, was a Dutch pop band best remembered for the 1980s hits "Fred Astaire" and "Cheese." The band was known to be an experimental pop band during the new wave era.

Biography
The Mo was founded in 1979 by brothers Clemens and Huub de Lange.

Their debut album Mo, with Heili Helder on vocals and Harm Bieger on drums, had a remarkable instrumentation; the band used no guitar but other instruments such as a Wurlitzer electric piano, clavinet and bassoon instead.

In February 1981 the album reached the top 10. Successful singles from the album were "Nancy" and "Fred Astaire".

After the original group had broken up in mid 1981, Harm Bieger made a new start, recruiting five new members, including singer Linda Bloemhard. He tried to sustain the original sound of the Mo. Two albums followed (Ha! Ha! The Sound of Laughing and Stop Staring), but failed to make much of an impact, although the song "Cheese" did become a modest hit in dance hall circuits.

The single "Asia" in 1984 became a major hit, but it failed to save the group.

The group disbanded right after the release of their 1984 album Stop Staring.

In 2013 Linda Bloemhard re-recorded "Cheese" with American producer Fernando Perdomo in Los Angeles.

Members
(1979–1981)
 Heili Helder – vocals
 Clemens de Lange – piano, keyboards, bass, synthesizer
 Huub de Lange – organ, keyboards, synthesizer
 Harm Bieger – drums

(1981–1985)
 Linda Bloemhard – vocals
 Ton van der Meer – synthesizer
 Hans Nieuwint – synthesizer
 Harm Bieger – drums
 Eddie Conard – percussion
 Willem Ennes – keyboards, producer

Discography
 Mo (1980, Backdoor)
 Ha! Ha! The Sound of Laughing (1982, Backdoor)
 Stop Staring (1984, Backdoor)

References 

Musical groups established in 1979
Musical groups disestablished in 1985
Dutch new wave musical groups